was a Japanese jurist and politician from Suita, Osaka.

Early life and academic career
After graduating from Tohoku Imperial University in 1933, Kuroda was sent to Manchukuo to be an instructor at a service academy. He spent five years in a Siberian labor camp before he returned to Japan in 1950, and became a professor of law at Osaka City University in 1956.

Political career
Kuroda was elected as governor of Osaka Prefecture in 1971, supported by the Japan Socialist Party and the Japanese Communist Party. In 1975, he became the first Japanese governor who won reelection with backing only from the Japanese Communist Party. He unsuccessfully ran for a third term in 1979.

While he was in office, Kuroda took positive antipollution measures and introduced free medical care for the elderly. He rejected a plan to build a missile base in Osaka, for he held a view that the Self-Defense Forces were unconstitutional.

Later life
After he left from politics, Kuroda practiced at the bar. He became a member of Japan Lawyers Association for Freedom in 1981.

He died of pneumonia at age 92.

References

20th-century Japanese lawyers
Scholars of constitutional law
Governors of Osaka
People from Suita
1911 births
2003 deaths
Deaths from pneumonia in Japan
Tohoku University alumni